Tirunelveli district was one of the districts in the erstwhile Madras Presidency of British India. It covered the area of the present-day districts of Tirunelveli, Thoothukudi, Tenkasi and few parts of Virudhunagar in Tamil Nadu.

Demographics 
As of 1901, Tirunelveli had a population of 2,059,607 with a significant number of Muslims and Christians.

Administration 
There were four municipalities: Tirunelveli, Srivilliputtur, Tuticorin and Palayamkottai.
Headquarters was Palayamkottai..

Taluks 
 Ambasamudram (Area:; Headquarters: Ambasamudram)
 Nanguneri (Area:; Headquarters: Nanguneri)
 Ottapidaram (Area:; Headquarters: Ottapidaram)
 Sankaranarayanankoil (Area:; Headquarters: Sankaranarayanankoil)
 Sattur (Area:; Headquarters: Sattur)
 Srivaikuntam (Area:; Headquarters: Srivaikuntam)
 Srivilliputtur (Area:; Headquarters: Srivilliputtur)
 Tenkasi (Area:; Headquarters: Tenkasi)
 Tirunelveli (Area:; Headquarters: Tirunelveli)

Districts of the Madras Presidency